Achimota School (/ɑːtʃimoʊtɑː/ ), formerly Prince of Wales College and School at Achimota, later Achimota College, now nicknamed Motown, is a co-educational boarding school located at Achimota in Accra, Greater Accra, Ghana. The school was founded in 1924 by Sir Frederick Gordon Guggisberg, Dr. James Emman Kwegyir Aggrey and the Rev. Alec Garden Fraser. It was formally opened in 1927 by Sir Frederick Guggisberg, then Governor of the British Gold Coast colony. Achimota, modelled on the British public school system, was the first mixed-gender school to be established on the Gold Coast.

The school has educated many Ghanaian leaders, including Kwame Nkrumah, Edward Akufo-Addo, Jerry John Rawlings, and John Evans Atta Mills all of whom are former Heads of State of Ghana. Kofi Abrefa Busia, a former Ghanaian head of government and prime minister, taught and studied at Achimota. Also included in its list of African heads of state are Zimbabwe's second president Robert Mugabe and Sir Dawda Jawara, first head of state of The Gambia. An alumnus/alumna of Achimota is known as an "Akora".

The motto of the school is Ut Omnes Unum Sint meaning "That they all may be one", a reference to the founders' expressed philosophy that starting in the context of school life, black and white, male and female, everyone should integrate and combine synergistically for the good of all. The stylised piano-key design of the Achimota School crest was described by Aggrey at the time: "You can play a tune of sorts on the black keys only; and you can play a tune of sorts on the white keys only; but for perfect harmony, you must use both the black and the white keys."

History
After the First World War, the Government of the Gold Coast felt the need for an advanced education. As Guggisberg put it, "In spite of the existence of one or two educational institutions of a secondary nature, the intellectual gap between the African who had completed his education at an English University and the semi-educated African of our primary school is dangerously wide. No one is more ready than I to sympathize with the legitimate aspirations of the African for advancement and for a greater share in the Government of this country, but if we are to help him to do this, if we are to protect the masses from the hasty and ill-conceived schemes of possible local demagogues, we must hasten as rapidly as our means will allow to fill up the gap between the two classes."

Achimota College was therefore established as part of Guggisberg's plan to reform the Gold Coast educational system. In August 1920, Guggisberg met and befriended native-born Dr. James Aggrey who was in the Gold Coast as a member of the Phelps Stokes Fund's African Education Commission. In 1922, as a result of the Phelps-Stokes Commission's 1920 report on education, Guggisberg appointed a committee to review its recommendations for Gold Coast education reform. That committee recommended the establishment of a comprehensive institution at Achimota to provide general secondary education, teacher training and technical education for male students. Achimota College was then conceived, thanks to the effort and support of Chiefs such as Nene Sir Emmanuel Mate Kole, Konor of Manya Krobo; Nana Sir Ofori Atta, Omanhene of Akyem Abuakwa and Nana Amonoo V, Omanhene of Anomabo, as well as prominent statesmen of the time such as the Hon. Dr. Benjamin W. Quartey Quaye Papafio, the Hon. F. V. Nanka-Bruce, both of Accra; the Hon. Thomas Hutton-Mills, Sr. of Accra, the Hon. E. J. P. Brown of Cape Coast, and the Hon. J. E. Casely-Hayford of Sekondi.

The Colonial government meant to carry out its policy to establish an excellent secondary institution where teachers as well as students would be trained. The Legislative Council went on to approve the 1923–24 budget for the establishment of the Prince of Wales College and School, and in March 1924, Guggisberg laid the foundation stone. Rev. Alexander G. Fraser was the first Principal (1924–1935), and Dr. James Aggrey was the first Vice-Principal (1924–1927). Fraser had previously been Principal of Trinity College, Kandy, an elite school in Ceylon, now Sri Lanka, and was hailed as the greatest colonial headmaster of his day by the Oxford Dictionary of National Biography. Aggrey campaigned vigorously for women's education at a time when the idea was not popular, and held the belief that to educate a man was to educate an individual, while educating a woman had more far-reaching benefits to family and community. This led to an increase in the number of places offered to girls by the College.

From 1924 until it opened on 28 January 1927, Guggisberg, Fraser and Aggrey worked together to realise Guggisberg's dream of establishing a first-class co-educational school and college. The University College of the Gold Coast, which is now known as the University of Ghana, had its roots in Achimota College. The University of Ghana holds its annual Aggrey-Fraser-Guggisberg Memorial Lecture series to honour the founders' contributions to education in Ghana. The Kwame Nkrumah University of Science and Technology (KNUST) also had its roots in Achimota College's Engineering School.

Achimota, originally known as the Prince of Wales College and School, was formally opened on 28 January 1927 by the then Governor of the Gold Coast, Sir Frederick Gordon Guggisberg. The guest of honour at the opening ceremony was Edward VIII, the then Prince of Wales, after whom the school was named. As one of the most prestigious institutions of its kind, known for its high academic standards and culture, it trained Pan-Africanist leaders during Sub-Saharan Africa's struggle for independence from colonial powers. From its student body and teaching college emerged many notable African personalities, including several heads of state, politicians, academics, scientists, doctors, lawyers, engineers, educators, architects, diplomats, computer scientists, agriculturists, accountants, artists, business leaders and industrialists. In a 2004 tribute to Akora Adrian Sherwood, a longtime English master at Achimota, the Ghana High Commission in London praised Achimota, quoting the words of the school's founding doctrine, for enabling its graduates "to know the life that is life indeed and go forth from it as living waters to a thirsty land."

Music has always played a very important part in the life of the school. Achimota’s achievements in attaining a high standard in this field led to the establishment of the Ghanaian National Symphony Orchestra and the department of music and performing art education at the University of Education, Winneba. From its inception Achimota placed special emphasis on the value of the use of one's hands in agriculture, technical and vocational. Achimota has concerned itself to set a standard of excellence in whatever field of education that meets the national needs.

Campus life

Setting
"Though set upon a desert hill, may living waters rise in thee. And from thy children wider flow, the rivers of eternity" —quote from school hymn

Achimota School occupies over two square miles (525 hectares) of prime real estate in the middle of the Achimota Forest Reserve in the Accra Metropolitan Area. The school's colonial architecture and planned landscape make it visually pleasing to tour the campus and its wooded countryside-like surroundings. On campus, the three Statues of the founders are arranged in a triangle-like formation with an unknown significance. The campus facilities comprise two libraries, a cadet square, two chapels - the Aggrey Memorial Chapel and the Catholic Chapel; four dining halls, two on the eastern compound and another two on the Western campus, two gymnasia, the Achimota School Post Office, extensive sports playing fields, a swimming pool, a cricket oval, basketball court, tennis and squash courts, and an arboretum. There are several bungalows on campus for teaching staff members. 

A description of Achimota School at its inception is provided below:
"Achimota College, in the Gold Coast seven miles inland from Accra is West Africa's great co-educational boarding school, where 600 West African boys and girls receive as complete an education as European or American children. It is a secondary school, teachers' training college and university rolled into one, and in planning, design and equipment it bears comparison with any educational institution anywhere. Its erection in 1925 cost £660,000 and its maintenance costs are £50,000 annually. It possesses a swimming pool, extensive playing fields, a nature reserve, a demonstration farm and a model village for the college employees. It also has its own hospital, museum, library and printing press. The students live in residential blocks spaced round the grounds, each holding 60 students and divided into 4 dormitories."

Close to the school's central campus are the Achimota Golf Club, the Achimota School Police Station, a staff village for the school's non-teaching employees also called Anumle, a forest reserve, a large farm, and the 45-bed Achimota Hospital, as well as the community surrounding the campus.

Houses
Achimota School has seventeen male and female houses on its Eastern (E) and Western (W) Compounds.

Male houses
Fraser House (W) – named after the Rev. Alexander (Alec) Garden Fraser (formerly House 12)
Aggrey House (E) – named after James Kwegyir Aggrey; first house to be established on campus
Guggisberg House (E) – named after Sir Frederick Gordon Guggisberg 
Gyamfi House (E) – named after a former student and member of the Asante royal family. Gyamfi died while a student at Achimota, and one of the consequences of his death was that the Asante Kingdom decided to have its own version of Achimota closer to home, thus was born Prempeh College.

Cadbury House (E) – named after Cadbury
Lugard House (E) – named after Lord Lugard, former Governor of Nigeria
Livingstone House (E) – named after David Livingstone, a Scottish missionary explorer of Africa
Kwapong House (W) – named after Alexander Kwapong, alumnus and first African Vice-Chancellor of the University of Ghana, Legon and Vice Rector of the UN University, Tokyo

Female houses
Kingsley House (E) – named after Mary Kingsley, an English ethnographic and scientific writer and explorer
McCarthy House (E) – named after Sir Charles McCarthy, a former British military governor to territories in West Africa (McCarthy House was formerly a male house and an Engineering School)
Slessor House (E) – named after Mary Mitchell Slessor, a Scottish missionary in Nigeria
Clark House (E) – named after English missionary Mary Clark. It was the first female house to be built.
Ofori-Atta House (W) – named after Susan Ofori-Atta, alumna and Ghana's first female medical doctor (formerly House 11)
Baeta-Jiagge House (W) – named after Annie Jiagge, alumna and the first woman to become a  judge in Ghana and the Commonwealth of Nations (formerly House 17)
Stopford House (W) – named in honour of Anglican Bishop and school principal (1941–45), Robert Stopford (formerly a male house and later, a female house, O. A. A. House and earlier, House 18)
Atta Mills House (E) – named after John Evans Atta Mills, alumnus and President of Ghana (2009–12)
Aryee House (E) – named after Joyce Aryee, alumna, politician and business executive

Learning environment
Resuming in 2002, lessons in aspects of Ghanaian culture such as drumming, dancing and woodcarving were revamped in an effort to incorporate more of the national culture into the curriculum. Apart from the academic and intellectual development of its students, the school emphasises practical skills and character training. The school runs on a three-term academic calendar from mid-September to late June.

There are two departments, two designated Schools, and a Home Science Unit responsible for the teaching of the subjects offered. The Science and Mathematics Department teaches courses in mathematics, physics, chemistry, biology, agriculture and computer science, while the Arts Department teaches English language and literature, French, government, history, economics, geography, religion and social studies. The music school teaches music, trains the Aggrey Memorial Chapel Choir and organises music festivals; the Art School teaches visual arts; and the Home Science Department teaches home economics, catering, nutrition, life management, housekeeping, bookkeeping and clothing design.

In their first two years, students must take physical education and "religious and moral education" every term, taught by the sports and chaplaincy departments, respectively. Also on staff are four Christian chaplains (Catholic, Anglican, Methodist and Presbyterian) as well as a Muslim cleric. Each student is required to take seven or eight subjects (depending on the programme) during each term of their three years of secondary school; in addition to three or four elective subjects taken by every student in one programme of study, each student must take the four core subjects: mathematics, English language, integrated science and social studies.

The school's three-year programme (six semesters) leads to the West African Senior School Certificate Examination (WASSCE), in any of the general sciences, agricultural science, general arts, visual arts and home economics, all administered by the West African Examinations Council (WAEC) in May of their final year.

Principals and heads

Ties to similar schools

Trinity College, Kandy, Ceylon now Sri Lanka (founded 1872): One of the founding fathers, Rev. Alexander G. Fraser (headmaster) was principal of Trinity College, Kandy from 1904 to 1924. He was the first principal of Achimota from 1924 to 1935.  Also, Rev. Robert Stopford who headed Trinity College, Kandy, from 1935 to 1941, was principal of Achimota from 1941 to 1945. The famous Aggrey Memorial Chapel, venue for morning assembly, weekly Sunday services and other important events, was modelled on the open-style architecture of Trinity College Chapel, Kandy.  Aggrey Chapel ranks among the most popular places in Accra to hold weddings.
 King's College, Lagos, Nigeria (founded 1909): Achimota and King's College had Inter-College Athletic Competitions during the 1960s and early 1970s. In 2008, Achimota School played host to King's College, Lagos, in a four-day exchange programme from Thursday 29 May 2008 to Sunday 1 June 2008. Activities lined up for the programme were hockey, cricket and football (soccer), with a dinner to round the competition off. The games were played at Achimota School's main playing fields. As King's College, Lagos celebrated its Centenary in 2009, Achimota School was invited for a second Achimota School – Kings College Games Conference as part of the anniversary celebrations.

Trivia

 Mascot: The school's mascot is a mythical creature called "Kuziunik" and is represented by a gargoyle-like wooden sculpture. In prior years, there was a tradition known as "Kuziunik's Night". The present location of the Kuziunik is atop a shelf by the east wall of the school library.
Publications: Achimota School has two student magazines, "The Achimotan" and the more recent one "The Motowner" both published periodically. Two newsletters also exist on campus: The Blueprint (Originally a publication of Guggisberg House)and The Motown Express.
P. T. A: Achimota School has a Parent-Teacher Association (PTA) that was formed during the era of Mr A. P. Rudwick, Headmaster (1965–1977). The body meets each term to discuss issues pertaining to students' welfare and school development.
Ranking: Achimota School ranks among Africa's Top 100 High Schools according to a 2003 list compiled by Africa Almanac.
Academic Competitions: Achimota School has won the National Science and Math Quiz competition twice (1998 and 2004) and remains the only mixed school ever to win quiz. Achimota School emerged first runner-up in the quiz's maiden edition in 1994 and also placed second in the 2009 competition. 
University Leadership: Achimota has also produced a total of about ten vice-chancellors at Ghana's two leading public research universities, University of Ghana and Kwame Nkrumah University of Science and Technology, KNUST.

Old Achimotan Association

The Old Achimotan Association (OAA) is the umbrella alumni organisation for past students of Achimota School. The OAA authorises the formation of regional, branch and year groups to carry out its objectives. Members of the OAA are known as "Akoras".

History: The OAA was started in 1929 by the first principal of the then Prince of Wales College, Rev. Alec G. Fraser, whose son Sandy Fraser, then a member of Achimota School’s staff, was the first organising secretary. Sandy spent his vacations touring towns and villages where Old Achimotans were working to explain the aims and objectives of the OAA. The OAA’s first annual general meeting was held at the school on 23 December 1930, and then once a year thereafter. The participants spend three or four days on the school’s campus.
Constitution: The OAA is governed by a constitution, whose principal objective is "the formation of a bond of union between Old Achimotans and the School to promote the maintenance of their interest in the School and their willingness to assist in its welfare, and to promote the ideals for which Achimota was founded".
National Executive Committee: The OAA's affairs and funds are managed by a National Executive Committee. The Committee consists of three officers of the Association, two ex-officio officers, the immediate past President of the Association and eight other members. The National Executive Committee is elected biennially at an Annual General Meeting. The OAA Alumni Office assists the National Executive Committee in its work.

References

External links
 
 

High schools in Ghana
Education in Accra
Educational institutions established in 1924
Boarding schools in Ghana
1924 establishments in Gold Coast (British colony)
Alumni of Achimota School
Christian schools in Ghana
Public schools in Ghana
Schools in Accra
Greater Accra Region
Mixed schools in Ghana